The 1971–72 season was the 61st season in Hajduk Split’s history and their 26th season in the Yugoslav First League. Their 1st place finish in the 1970–71 season meant it was their 26th successive season playing in the Yugoslav First League.

Competitions

Overall

Yugoslav First League

Classification

Matches

First League 

Source: hajduk.hr

Yugoslav Cup 

Sources: hajduk.hr

European Cup 

Source: hajduk.hr

Player seasonal records

Top scorers 

Source: Competitive matches

See also 
 1971–72 Yugoslav First League
 1971–72 Yugoslav Cup

External sources 
 1971–72 Yugoslav First League at rsssf.com
 1971–72 Yugoslav Cup at rsssf.com
 1971–72 European Cup at rsssf.com

HNK Hajduk Split seasons
Hajduk Split